Abdullah Cabinet is the name of any of three cabinets of Malaysia:
 Cabinet Abdullah I (2003–2004)
 Cabinet Abdullah II (2004–2008)
 Cabinet Abdullah III (2008–2009)